KJPX-LP was a low power television station in Joplin, Missouri, broadcasting locally on channel 47. The station was owned Deborah Kenny and broadcast at an effective radiated power of 25 kW.

KJPX-LP's license was cancelled by the Federal Communications Commission on August 4, 2021, as it failed to obtain a license for digital operation by the July 13, 2021 deadline.

External links

Retro TV affiliates
JPX-LP
Television channels and stations established in 2002
2002 establishments in Missouri
Defunct television stations in the United States
Television channels and stations disestablished in 2021
2021 disestablishments in Missouri
JPX-LP